Musa Ilhan (born 3 October 1969) is an Australian wrestler. He competed at the 1992 Summer Olympics and the 2000 Summer Olympics.

References

1969 births
Living people
Australian male sport wrestlers
Australian people of Turkish descent
Olympic wrestlers of Australia
Wrestlers at the 1992 Summer Olympics
Wrestlers at the 2000 Summer Olympics
People from Çarşamba